The 2018 Mercedes-Benz Challenge is the eighth season of the Mercedes-Benz Challenge. Fernando Júnior is the defending champion in the CLA AMG Cup whilst Claudio Simão is the defending champion for the C250 Cup class.

Teams and drivers

Notes

Race calendar and results
The entire championship will be accompanied by the Copa Truck in eight of the nine stages of the category, with exercise of the stage of Buenos Aires, counting with a stage in the Autódromo de Rivera in Uruguay.

References

External links
  

Mercedes-Benz Challenge seasons
Mercedes-Benz Challenge season